Cullberg can refer to:

 Birgit Cullberg (1908–1999), Swedish choreographer
 Cullberg Ballet, her eponymous company
 Erland Cullberg (1931–2012), Swedish artist